This is a list of states and union territories of India by speakers of Telugu as of census 2011.

See also
States of India by urban population
States of India by size of economy

References

Telugu speakers
Telugu language